Djuric Winklaar (born 3 January 1982) is a Curaçaoan former professional footballer who played as a midfielder.

He played nine times for the Netherlands Antilles national football team - eight of these were World Cup qualification matches and the other was an international friendly against Venezuela.

Club career
Winklaar started his career with SC Heerenveen before moving to Italian side Lecce for a fee of €1.55 million. He later moved on to play for SPAL as well as for AGOVV in the Eerste Divisie.

In June 2010 he joined Dutch amateur side Veensche Boys from fellow amateurs Geinoord. A year later, he moved on to FC Breukelen, where he remained until the end of his career in 2015. His profession now is electrician.

External links

References

1982 births
Living people
Curaçao footballers
Association football midfielders
Dutch Antillean footballers
Netherlands Antilles international footballers
Dutch Antillean expatriate footballers
S.P.A.L. players
AGOVV Apeldoorn players
Eerste Divisie players
Expatriate footballers in Italy
Eerste Klasse players
Vierde Divisie players
SC Heerenveen players
U.S. Lecce players
Serie B players